Wacław Tokarz (7 June 1873 in Częstochowa - 3 May 1937 in Warsaw) was a Polish historian and military officer. A Colonel of the Polish Army and a professor of both the Warsaw University and Jagiellonian University, he authored numerous books on the 19th century military history of Poland, notably two monumental monographs on the Battle of Warsaw (1831) and the Warsaw Uprising of 1794.

1873 births
1937 deaths
People from Częstochowa
Polish Army officers
20th-century Polish historians
Polish male non-fiction writers
Recipients of the Legion of Honour
Officers of the Order of Polonia Restituta
Recipients of the Cross of Valour (Poland)
National League (Poland) members
Academic staff of the University of Warsaw
Burials at Powązki Cemetery